3793 Leonteus  is a large Jupiter trojan from the Greek camp, approximately  in diameter. It was discovered on 11 October 1985, by American astronomer couple Carolyn and Eugene Shoemaker at the Palomar Observatory in California, United States. The D-type Jovian asteroid belongs to the 30 largest Jupiter trojans and has a rotation period of 5.6 hours. It was named after the hero Leonteus from Greek mythology.

Orbit and classification 

Leonteus is a dark Jovian asteroid orbiting in the leading Greek camp at Jupiter's  Lagrangian point, 60° ahead of its orbit in a 1:1 resonance (see Trojans in astronomy). It is also a non-family asteroid in the Jovian background population.

It orbits the Sun at a distance of 4.8–5.7 AU once every 11 years and 11 months (4,350 days; semi-major axis of 5.22 AU). Its orbit has an eccentricity of 0.09 and an inclination of 21° with respect to the ecliptic.

Physical characteristics 

In both the Tholen- and SMASS-like taxonomy of the Small Solar System Objects Spectroscopic Survey (S3OS2), Leonteus is a D-type asteroid. It is also a D-type in the SDSS-based taxonomy, while the Collaborative Asteroid Lightcurve Link (CALL) assumes it to be of carbonaceous composition.

Rotation period 

Since 1994, several rotational lightcurves have been obtained from photometric observations by Stefano Mottola and Anders Erikson using the Dutch 0.9-metre and Bochum 0.61-metre telescopes at La Silla Observatory in Chile, as well as by American photometrist Robert Stephens at the Center for Solar System Studies in California.

Analysis of Mottola's best-rated lightcurve from June 1994 gave a rotation period of  hours with a brightness variation of  magnitude.

Diameter and albedo 

According to the surveys carried out by the Infrared Astronomical Satellite IRAS, the Japanese Akari satellite and the NEOWISE mission of NASA's Wide-field Infrared Survey Explorer, Leonteus measures between 86.26 and 112.05 kilometers in diameter and its surface has an albedo between 0.042 and 0.072.

CALL derives an albedo of 0.0784 and a diameter of 86.38 kilometers based on an absolute magnitude of 8.7.

Naming 

This minor planet was named from Greek mythology after Leonteus, a hero of the Trojan War, who attempted to win a competition among the Greek warriors to see who could throw an iron meteorite the farthest. However, he lost the game to his associate, Polypoites, after whom the minor planet 3709 Polypoites is named. The official naming citation was published by the Minor Planet Center on 27 August 1988.

Notes

References

External links 
 Asteroid Lightcurve Database (LCDB), query form (info )
 Dictionary of Minor Planet Names, Google books
 Discovery Circumstances: Numbered Minor Planets (1)-(5000) – Minor Planet Center
 
 

003793
Discoveries by Carolyn S. Shoemaker
Discoveries by Eugene Merle Shoemaker
Named minor planets
19851011